The A. K. Antony Ministry from 17 May 2001 to August 2004 (third term) had 21 ministers.

Achievements
The Akshaya project was implemented in 2002 by providing E-literacy to the people those who haven't it and opening Akshaya centres in the remote rural areas of the state, thus ensuring Internet availability all over the state, aiming to make Kerala the first complete E-literate state of India.

References

Antony 03
Indian National Congress of Kerala
Indian National Congress state ministries
2001 establishments in Kerala
2004 disestablishments in India
Cabinets established in 2001
Cabinets disestablished in 2004